Stephen Adams (born 28 September 1989) is a Ghanaian footballer who plays as a goalkeeper for Ghana national football team.

Club career
In 2010, Adams' club Aduana Stars won the Ghana Premier League. He was named Ghana's best domestically based goalkeeper in the same year.

International career
Adams earned his first call-up for Ghana on 13 May 2010 for the 2010 FIFA World Cup.

On 13 January 2014, he made his debut for the Black Stars against Congo at the 2014 African Nations Championship. He was the team's first choice goalkeeper at the tournament, conceding only one goal in six matches as Ghana finished as runner-up to Libya.

On 2 June 2014, Adams was named in Ghana's squad for the 2014 FIFA World Cup.

References 

1989 births
Living people
Ghanaian footballers
Association football goalkeepers
2011 African Nations Championship players
2014 FIFA World Cup players
Ghana international footballers
Footballers from Kumasi
Aduana Stars F.C. players
Ghana A' international footballers
2014 African Nations Championship players